Lauritzen may refer to:

Surname:
Carl Lauritzen (1879–1940), Danish actor
Dag Otto Lauritzen (born 1956), retired Norwegian professional cyclist
Flemming Lauritzen (born 1949), former Danish handball player who competed in the 1972 Summer Olympics
Henny Lauritzen (1871–1938), Danish stage and film actress of the silent era in Denmark
Jan Thomas Lauritzen (born 1974), Norwegian handball player
Lau Lauritzen Sr. (1878–1938), Danish film director, screenwriter and actor of the silent era 
Lau Lauritzen Jr. (1910–1977), Danish actor, screenwriter, and film director
Lauritz Lauritzen (1910–1980), German politician of the Social Democratic Party of Germany (SPD)
Per Roger Lauritzen (born 1956), Norwegian non-fiction writer
Peter Lauritzen (born 1959), Danish civil servant
Sarah Lauritzen (born 1976), Danish rower
Sebastian Lauritzen, Swedish professional ice hockey winger
Steffen Lauritzen (born 1947), Head of the Department of Statistics at the University of Oxford
Torkil Lauritzen (1901–1979), Danish actor
Vilhelm Lauritzen (1894–1984), Danish modern architect, founder of Vilhelm Lauritzen Arkitekter

Geography:
Lauritzen Bay indents the coast of Antarctica between Cape Yevgenov and Coombes Ridge
Lauritzen Canal, shipping waterway, part of the larger Port of Richmond in Richmond, California
Lauritzen Gardens, (formally Omaha Botanical Gardens), botanical gardens and arboretum in Omaha, Nebraska

Corporate:
J. Lauritzen A/S (JL), Danish shipping company with worldwide operations headquartered in Copenhagen
Vilhelm Lauritzen Architects (VLA), architectural firm based in Copenhagen, Denmark
Lauritzen Corporation, financial and interstate bank holding company headquartered in Omaha, Nebraska

See also
Lauritzen Award (Danish: Lauritzen-prisen), Danish film award
Lauritzen Hoffman Growth Theory or Hoffman nucleation theory, describes the crystallization of a polymer in terms of the kinetics and thermodynamics of polymer surface nucleation
Lauritzen A.S. v Wijsmuller B.V, (The Super Servant Two), a Court of Appeal case in English contract law
Lauritz (given name)
Ritzen (surname)